Aliaga or Aliağa or Aliagha may refer to:

Places
 Aliağa, a town and district of İzmir Province, Turkey
 Aliağa, Tarsus, a village in Tarsus district of Mersin Province, Turkey
 Aliaga, Aragon, a town in Spain
 Aliaga, Nueva Ecija, a municipality on Luzon, the Philippines

Given name
 Aliagha Vahid (1895–1955), Azerbaijani poet

Surname
Felipe Pardo y Aliaga (1806–1868), Peruvian  poet, satirist, playwright, lawyer, and politician
Rafael López Aliaga, Peruvian politician and businessman

Other uses
 Aliağa (İZBAN), commuter rail station at Aliağa, İzmir in Turkey
 Aliağa Petkim, professional basketball team in Aliağa, İzmir in Turkey
 Aliağa Wind Farm, in the district
 Aliaga (mammal)'', a fossil genus of mammals in the family Spalacotheriidae

See also
 Aliağalı, a village in the Agdam Rayon of Azerbaijan